Namig Hasanov (born 20 October 1979) is an Azerbaijani football player. He has played for Azerbaijan national team.

National team statistics

References

1979 births
Living people
Azerbaijani footballers

Association football midfielders
Azerbaijan international footballers